Astiericeras is an ammonite from the Lower Cretaceous, the shell of which is evolute, stout; outer whorl with strong, well spaced, transverse ribs that cross smoothly over the broad venter; early whorls with lateral tubercles. The outer, mature whorl separates from the coil but hooks back quickly, referred to as a heteromorph.

Astiericeras is generally considered to be a douvillieceratid. However, according to W. J. Kennedy, the genus may instead be a scaphitoid.

References

Cretaceous ammonites
Fossils of France
Albian life
Albian genus extinctions